West Meredith Cemetery is a historic cemetery located at West Meredith in Delaware County, New York, United States. It is a burial ground affiliated with a former Baptist congregation and the earliest stone dates to 1807. It contains the graves of many of Meredith's earliest settlers.

It was listed on the National Register of Historic Places in 2003.

See also
 National Register of Historic Places listings in Delaware County, New York

References

Cemeteries on the National Register of Historic Places in New York (state)
National Register of Historic Places in Delaware County, New York
Cemeteries in Delaware County, New York